Clay Township is one of twelve townships in Hendricks County, Indiana, United States. As of the 2010 census, its population was 2,256.

History
Clay Township was organized in 1845.

Geography

Cities and towns
 Amo
 Coatesville

Unincorporated towns
 Pecksburg
 Reno
 Springtown
(This list is based on USGS data and may include former settlements.)

Adjacent townships
 Marion Township (north)
 Center Township (northeast)
 Liberty Township (east)
 Franklin Township (south)
 Floyd Township, Putnam County (west)
 Marion Township, Putnam County (west)

Cemeteries
The township contains eight cemeteries: Amo, Bethel Lutheran, Coatesville, Hadley Friends, Moravian, Old Spring, Springtown Methodist and West Branch Friends.

Major highways
  Indiana State Road 75

Airports and landing strips
 Marcidale Airport 8IN9

Education
Clay Township residents may obtain a free library card from the Coatesville-Clay Township Public Library in Coatesville.

References
 
 United States Census Bureau cartographic boundary files

External links

Townships in Hendricks County, Indiana
Townships in Indiana